The Jessie Bernard Award is given by the American Sociological Association in recognition of scholarly work that has enlarged the horizons of sociology to encompass fully the role of women in society. The contribution may be in empirical research, theory or methodology. It is presented for significant cumulative work done throughout a professional career, and is open to women or men and is not restricted to sociologists."

ASA Jessie Bernard Award was originally a biennial award for career and/or publication, and is now annual. The award is named after Jessie Bernard.

Recipients 
The Award was originally a biennial award for career and/or publication, and is now annual.
2021 - Jyoti Puri
2020 - Jennifer Glass
2019 - Rhacel Salazar Parreñas
2017 - Raewyn Connell, career
2016 - Ronnie J. Steinberg, career
2015 - Nancy A. Naples, career
2014 - Esther Ngan-ling Chow, career
2014 - Christine L. Williams, career
2013 - Kathleen Gerson, career
2012 - Michael A. Messner, career
2011 - Verta Taylor, career
2010 - Harriet Presser, career
2009 - Cecilia L. Ridgeway, career
2008 - Arlie Hochschild, career
2007 - Patricia Yancey Martin, career
2006 - Margaret L. Andersen, career
2005 - Evelyn Nakano Glenn, career
2004 - Myra Marx Ferree, career
2003 - Cynthia Fuchs Epstein, career
2002 - Barrie Thorne, career
2001 - Barbara Laslett, career
2000 - Maxine Baca Zinn, career
1999 - Paula England, career
1998 - Ruth A. Wallace, career
1997
Nona Glazer, career; 
Robbie Pfeufer Kahn, Bearing Meaning: The Language of Birth (University of Illinois Press, 1995);
Honorable Mention: Pierrette Hondagneu-Sotelo, Gendered Transitions: Mexican Experiences of Immigration (University of California Press, 1994).
1996
Judith Lorber, career; 
Diane L. Wolf, Factory Daughters (University of California Press, 1992).
1995
Arlene Kaplan Daniels, career; 
Ruth Frankenberg, White Women, Race Matters: The Social Construction of Whiteness (Minnesota);
Elizabeth Lapovsky Kennedy and Madeline D. Davis, Boots of Leather, Slippers of Gold: The History of A Lesbian Community (Routledge).
1993
Dorothy Smith, career; 
Memphis State University Center for Research on Women (Bonnie Thornton Dill, Elizabeth Higginbotham, Lynn Weber) for significant collective work;
Patricia Hill Collins, Black Feminist Thought: Knowledge, Consciousness, and the Politics of Empowerment.
1991 - Barbara Katz Rothman, Recreating Motherhood: Ideology and Technology in a Patriarchical Society (W.W. Norton & Co., 1989).
1989 
Joan Acker, career; 
Samuel R. Cohn, The Process of Occupational Sex Typing: The Feminization of Clerical Labor in Great Britain (Temple University Press, 1985);
Honorable Mention: Karen Brodkin Sacks, Caring by the Hour (University of Illinois Press).
1987
Sandra Harding, The Science Question in Feminism (Cornell University Press, 1986);
Judith Rollins, Between Women: Domestics and Their Employers (Temple University Press, 1986).
1985
Joan Huber, career;
Judith G. Stacey, Patriarchy and the Socialist Revolution in China.
1983 - Alice Rossi, career
1981 - Elise Boulding, career
1979
Valerie Kincaid Oppenheimer, The Female Labor Force in the United States: Demographic and Economic Factors Governing Its Growth and Changing Composition (University of California and Greenwood Press); 
Nancy Chodorow, The Reproduction of Mothering: Psychoanalysis and the Sociology of Gender (University of California Press);
Honorable Mention to Kristin Luker, Taking Chances: Abortion and the Decision Not to Contracept (University of California Press).

See also

 List of social sciences awards

References 
 Jessie Bernard Award
 Patricia Yancey Martin, The Significance of the Jessie Bernard Award, ASA Footnotes, July-August 2009 Issue • Volume 37 • Issue 6

Women studies awards
Gender studies awards
Feminism in the United States
Social sciences awards
Sociology awards
American Sociological Association